Confetti is an album by Sérgio Mendes, released in 1983.

Most of the songs of the album were written by established US pop composers and lyricists such as Alan and Marilyn Bergman, Barry Mann, Cynthia Weil, Don Freeman, and Tom Snow. Among the notable singers on the album are Joe Pizzulo and Gracinha Leporace.

The song "Olympia" was written for the 1984 Summer Olympics in Los Angeles. Notable singles from album were: "Alibis", "Olympia" & "Let's Give a Little More This Time"

Track listing
"Olympia" (Barry Mann, Cynthia Weil) – 5:25
"Say It with Your Body" (John Bettis, Barry Mann, Cynthia Weil) – 4:31
"Let's Give a Little More This Time" (Barry Mann, Cynthia Weil) – 3:42
"The Sound of One Song (Depende de Nós)" (Ivan Lins, Vítor Martins, Cynthia Weil) – 3:23
"Alibis" (Tony Macaulay, Tom Snow) – 3:59
"Dance Attack" (David Batteau, Don Freeman) – 3:55
"Kisses" (Ivan Lins, Vítor Martins, Alan Bergman, Marilyn Bergman) – 3:20
"Real Life" (Barry Alfonso, Tom Snow) – 3:59
"Morrer de Amor" ("To Die of Love") (Oscar Castro-Neves, Luvercy Fiorini) – 3:29

Brazilian version
"Olympia" – 5:28
"Say It with Your Body" – 4:32
"Let's Give a Little More This Time" – 3:43
"Depende de Nós" (Ivan Lins, Vítor Martins) – 3:30
"Real Life" – 3:59
"Alibis" – 4:03
"Dance Attack" – 3:55
"Kisses" – 3:24
"To Die of Love" – 3:27
"Olympia" (Instrumental version) (Barry Mann) - 4:19

Personnel 
Musicians
 Sérgio Mendes – keyboards (1, 2, 3, 5, 6), arrangements (2-8), synthesizers (3, 4), synth solo (4), synthesizer arrangements (4), percussion (4), Fender Rhodes (7)
 Michael Boddicker – keyboards (1, 2, 5), synthesizer programming (1, 2, 5)
 Robbie Buchanan – keyboards (1, 2, 3, 5, 8), synthesizer programming (1, 2, 3), drum synthesizer programming (1), arrangements (1, 2, 3, 5, 8), synthesizers (3, 8)
 Don Dorsey – synthesizer programming (1, 5)
 Ivan Lins – acoustic piano (4, 7), arrangements (7)
 Gilson Perenzzetta – Fender Rhodes (4, 7), arrangements (7)
 John Beasley – synthesizers (4), synthesizer arrangements (4)
 Randy Waldman – synthesizers (4)
 John Barnes – keyboards (6), synthesizer programming (6), arrangements (6)
 Don Freeman – keyboards (6), arrangements (6)
 Dann Huff – guitars (1, 2, 3, 5), guitar solo (3, 8), electric guitar (4, 8)
 Paul Jackson Jr. – guitars (2, 3, 5), acoustic guitar (4)
 Oscar Castro-Neves – acoustic guitar (4, 7, 9)
 Nathan East – bass (2, 3, 4)
 Jimmy Johnson – bass (5, 8)
 John Robinson – drums (1, 2, 3)
 Terry Bozzio – drum synthesizer programming (1), clap-trap (6)
 Carlos Vega – drums (4, 5, 8)
 Steve Forman – percussion (1-7)
 Ron Powell – percussion (2)

Strings (Tracks 7 & 9)
 Dave Grusin – arrangements and conductor (7)
 Oscar Castro-Neves – arrangements and conductor (9)
 Mary Lane, Raphael Kramer, Harry Shlutz and David Speltz – cello
 Isabelle Daskoff, Reginald Hill, Bill Hybell, George Kast, Norma Leonard, Constance Meyer, David Montagu, Spiro Stamos, Robert Sushel, Mari Tsumura-Botnick, Gerard Vinci and Harold Wolf – violin

Vocals
 Joe Pizzulo – vocals (1, 3, 5, 8), additional backing vocals (1), backing vocals (5), BGV arrangements (5)
 Harold Clousing – additional backing vocals (1)
 Sérgio Mendes – additional backing vocals (1)
 Phil Perry – additional backing vocals (1), vocals (6)
 Siedah Garrett – vocals (2)
 Carmen Twillie – backing vocals (2, 3)
 Julia Waters – backing vocals (2, 3)
 Maxine Waters – backing vocals (2, 3)
 Gary Falcone – backing vocals (5), BGV arrangements (5)
 Tommy Faragher – backing vocals (5)
 Gracinha Leporace – vocals (7, 9)
Olympic choir on "Olympia"
 Beth Anderson, Deborah Davis, Gary Falcone, Lani Hall, James Ingram, Phil Perry, Joe Pizzulo, Jeffrey Osborne, Carmen Twillie, Julia Waters and Maxine Waters 
Children's choir on "The Sound of One Song"
 Kristin Bernhardi, Kristina Birk, Elizabeth Cathcart, Jennifer Cathcart, Rebecca Clinger, Teresa Dawson, Sandie Hall, Richard Hamilton, Jessica Harris, Joel Harris, Brandon Roberts and Latisha Smith
 Jon Joyce – vocal coordinator

Production 
 Sérgio Mendes – producer, liner notes 
 Barry Mann – producer (1)
 Robbie Buchanan – producer (2, 3, 5, 8)
 Bruce Swedien – associate producer, recording, mixing, liner notes 
 Geoff Gillette – recording
 Benny Faccone – assistant engineer 
 Bernie Grundman – mastering at Bernie Grundman Mastering (Hollywood, California)
 Roland Young – art direction 
 Otto Stupakoff – photography 
 Tracy Shiffman – design, illustration

Charts

Album

Singles

References

1983 albums
Sérgio Mendes albums
A&M Records albums
Albums arranged by Sérgio Mendes